Charles Rex Berry (September 9, 1924July 1, 2005) was a professional American football cornerback in the National Football League. He played six seasons for the San Francisco 49ers (1951–1956). He was a star athlete at Carbon High School (called the Carbon Comet) in Price, Utah in multiple sports and played on several American Legion baseball teams. At BYU he was on both the football and baseball teams. He combined on a 2-0 shutout of Smithfield with Eldon Rachele in state baseball play. He led Helper to the 1940 American Legion state baseball title.

Berry was a member of the Church of Jesus Christ of Latter-day Saints and served in several positions in the Church, including as a bishop and a member of a high council.

References

External links

1924 births
2005 deaths
People from Price, Utah
People from Moab, Utah
Latter Day Saints from Utah
American football cornerbacks
BYU Cougars football players
San Francisco 49ers players
Players of American football from Utah